This article contains information about the literary events and publications of 1738.

Events
April 11 – Robert Blair marries Isabella Law.
July 10 – Richard Dawes is appointed Master of the Royal Grammar School, Newcastle.
August – Laurence Sterne is ordained a priest, and in the autumn becomes vicar of Sutton-on-the-Forest, Yorkshire.
August 8 – Jonathan Swift writes to Alexander Pope describing the deterioration in his mental condition; Swift will eventually be given into the care of a legal guardian.
September 18 – Samuel Johnson composes his first solemn prayer (published 1785).

New books

Prose
James Anderson – The Constitutions of the Free-Masons, 2nd ed.
Jean-Baptiste de Boyer, Marquis d'Argens – Jewish Letters (published anonymously)
John Banks – Miscellaneous Works in Verse and Prose
Alexander Gottlieb Baumgarten – De ordine in audiendis philosophicis per triennium academicum quaedam praefatus acroases proximae aestati destinatas indicit Alexander Gottlieb Baumgarten
Louis de Beaufort – Dissertation sur l'incertitude des cinq prèmiers siècles de l'histoire romaine
Robert Dodsley – The Art of Preaching
Marie Huber – Lettres sur la religion essentielle à l'homme (Letters Concerning the Religion Essential to Man)
David Hume (anonymously) – A Treatise of Human Nature (dated 1739)
Pierre Louis Maupertuis – Sur la figure de la terre
Margareta Momma – Samtal emellan Argi Skugga och en obekant Fruentimbers Skugga (Conversation between the Shadow of Argus and the Unfamiliar Shadow of a Female)
Francis Moore – Travels into the Inland Parts of Africa
Abbé Prévost – Memoirs of a Man of Quality (anonymous English translation)
Thomas Shaw – Travels in Barbary and the Levant
Jonathan Swift 
The Beasts Confession to the Priest
A Complete Collection of Genteel and Ingenious Conversation
William Warburton 
The Divine Legation of Moses Demonstrated
A Vindication of the author of the Divine Legation of Moses
George Whitefield – A Journal of a Voyage from London to Savannah in Georgia
Diego de Torres Villarroel
Anatomía de todo lo visible e invisible
Vida ejemplar de la venerable madre Gregoria Francisca de Santa Teresa

Drama
Robert Dodsley – Sir John Cockle at Court
Carlo Goldoni
Momolo Cortesan
L'uomo di mondo
Sir Hildebrand Jacob
The Happy Constancy
The Prodigal Reformed
The Trial of Conjugal Love
George Lillo – Marina (adapted from Shakespeare's Pericles, Prince of Tyre)
 Charles Marsh – Amasis, King of Egypt
James Miller – 
 Art and Nature
 The Coffee House
Alexis Piron – La Metromanie
António José da Silva – Precipicio de Faetonte
James Thomson – Agamemnon

Poetry

Mark Akenside (anonymously) – A British Philippic
Elizabeth Carter (anonymously) – Poems Upon Particular Occasions
John Gay – Fables: Volume the Second
Eugenio Gerardo Lobo – Obras poéticas líricas
Samuel Johnson – London, A Poem, on the Third Satire of Juvenal
Alexander Pope 
The Sixth Epistle of the First Book of Horace Imitated
The First Epistle of the First Book of Horace Imitated
(with Jonathan Swift) An Imitation of the Sixth Satire of the Second Book of Horace
One Thousand Seven Hundred and Thirty Eight
The Universal Prayer
One Thousand Seven Hundred and Thirty Eight: Dialogue II
James Thomson – The Works of Mr Thomson
Diego de Torres Villarroel – Juguetes de Talia, entretenimiento del numen
John Wesley – A Collection of Psalms and Hymns (first English edition)

Births
February 9 (baptized) – Mary Whateley, English poet and playwright (died 1825)
May 9 – John Wolcot, English satirist and poet (died 1819)
May 12 – Jonathan Boucher, English philologist (died 1804)
May 27 – Moritz August von Thümmel, German humorist and satirical author (died 1817)
June 21 – Gottlieb Christoph Harless, German bibliographer (died 1815)
July 24 – Betje Wolff, Dutch novelist (died 1804)
November 15 – Joseph Johnson, English publisher (died 1809)
December 4 – Karl Friedrich Kretschmann, German poet, playwright and storyteller (died 1809)
unknown date – Manuel Lassala, Spanish dramatist and philosopher (died 1806)

Deaths
January 6 – Jean-Baptiste Labat, French polymath (born 1663)
March – Margrethe Lasson, Danish novelist (born 1659)
April 25 – Giacomo Laderchi, Italian ecclesiastical historian (born c. 1678)
June 5 – Isaac de Beausobre, French Protestant theologian (born 1659)
July 8 – Jean-Pierre Nicéron, French lexicographer (born 1685)
September 3 or 4 – George Lillo, English playwright (born 1691)
September 23 – Herman Boerhaave, Dutch humanist writer (born 1668)
November 10 – John Asgill, English pamphleteer (born 1659)

References

 
Years of the 18th century in literature